The Ein Shemer Airfield is an Israeli military airfield and base in northern Israel, located approximately 6 km east of Hadera. Before 1948 it was operated by the British Royal Air Force (RAF) as RAF Ein Shemer. During this time, "RAF Ein Shemer was the largest military airfield in the country" and hosted "seven ..RAF squadrons and 1,500 RAF personnel." Between the autumn of 1943 and June 1945, it was home to 78 Operational Training Unit training general reconnaissance crews, particularly using ASV radar and the Leigh light. It served as the workplace for as many as 600, mainly Arab, workers. This made it, in the opinion of its Commanding Officer, ‘the largest camp of its sort for civilian labour in the Middle East’.

Since 2002 the base houses a complete Arrow 2 Theater Anti Ballistic Missile battery which includes around 150-200 Arrow 2 Block 4 missiles, several launchers, the Great Pine Radar (Green Pine 2 Radar) with a 1000 kilometer range and the Yellow Citron & Brown Nut elements of the system.

In 2008 and again in 2012, the Israeli government proposed closing down Sde Dov and Herzlia airports and relocating their general aviation and civilian flight training activities to an expanded Ein Shemer airfield. Nearby residents however expressed strong opposition to the plan. In June 2019 the National Infrastructure Planning Committee voted to approve the plan but the local and regional municipalities vowed to continue opposing it.

The airfield is also the home of a control station for the IAI Heron UAV.

Gallery

RAF Ein Shemer
RAF Ein Shemer was a Royal Air Force station in Palestine between 1942 and 1948.

No. 78 Operational Training Unit RAF was formed in February 1944 at Ein Shemer to train general reconnaissance crews, particularly using ASV radar and the Leigh light.

The following Royal Air Force units were based at RAF Ein Shemer between 1945 and 1948:
No. 6 Squadron RAF (1946) Supermarine Spitfire LF9
No. 13 Squadron RAF (1946) de Havilland Mosquito PR34
No. 18 Squadron RAF (1946) Avro Lancaster ASR3
No. 32 Squadron RAF (1946-1948) Supermarine Spitfire IX and FR18
No. 37 Squadron RAF (1947) Avro Lancaster MR3
No. 38 Squadron RAF detachment (1946-1947) Avro Lancaster GR3
No. 178 Squadron RAF (1945) Consolidated Liberator VI
No. 208 Squadron RAF (1946-1948) Supermarine Spitfire VII and FR18
No. 214 Squadron RAF (1945) Consolidated Liberator VIII
No. 621 Squadron RAF (1946) Avro Lancaster ASR3
No. 651 Squadron RAF (1946-1947) Auster III and Auster AOP6
No. 680 Squadron RAF (1946) de Havilland Mosquito PR34

See also
List of Royal Air Force stations
List of former Royal Air Force stations

References

Further reading
Roy Marom, "RAF Ein-Shemer: Forgotten Case of Jewish and Arab Work in a British Army Camp in Palestine during the Second World War," War & Society 39, no. 3 (2020), pp. 189–209
Lake, Alan. "Flying Units of the RAF".Airlife Publishing. Shrewsbury. 1999. 
 Jefford, C.G. RAF Squadrons, a Comprehensive Record of the Movement and Equipment of all RAF Squadrons and their Antecedents since 1912. Shrewsbury, Shropshire, UK: Airlife Publishing, 2001. .

External links

 Eyn Shemer Airfield

Airports in Israel
Israeli Air Force bases